Archery at the 1983 Pan American Games was held in August 1993. The events took place at a temporary site in Caracas, Venezuela. Just like in the Olympics, the archery competition will be held using the recurve bow.

Medal summary

Medal table

Events

See also
 Archery at the 1984 Summer Olympics

References 

Events at the 1983 Pan American Games
1983
P